Events from the year 1599 in France

Incumbents
 Monarch – Henry IV

Events

Births

11 October – Abraham de Fabert, marshall of France (d. 1662)

Full date missing
Henri de La Ferté-Senneterre, marshal of France and governor of Lorraine (d. 1681)
Henri de Talleyrand-Périgord, comte de Chalais (d. 1626)
 Samuel Maresius, Protestant theologian (died 1673)
Madeleine de Souvré, marquise de Sablé, writer (d. 1678)
Jean-François Senault, Augustinian philosopher (d. 1672)

Deaths

10 April – Gabrielle d'Estrées, mistress, confidante and adviser of Henry IV of France (b. 1573)

Full date missing
Antoine Caron, glassmaker, painter and illustrator (b. 1521)
Philippe Hurault de Cheverny, nobleman and politician (b. 1528)

See also

References

1590s in France